Giancarlo "Gato" Serenelli Pellechia (born 10 July 1981 in Caracas) is a Venezuelan racing driver.

Career
After karting, Serenelli raced in Formula Ford in his native Venezuela, winning his first title in 2000. After racing in the Italian Formula Renault Championship in 2001, he reclaimed the Formula Ford title in 2002.

In 2007 he finished runner-up in the Formula Renault Panam GP series, with two wins from the nine races. In 2008 he won the LATAM Challenge Series, and after finishing runner-up in 2009 he won the title again in both 2010 and 2011.

In 2012 he returned to European competition, signing to race in the Auto GP World Series for Ombra Racing. He also signed to race in the GP2 Series with new team Venezuela GP Lazarus, where his team-mate was first Fabrizio Crestani and then Sergio Canamasas. After nine rounds of the championship, he was replaced by René Binder.

He signed with Belardi Auto Racing to make his debut in the Firestone Indy Lights series at the Mid-Ohio Sports Car Course in August 2013. He continued with the team, competing in the final four races of the season and finished 10th in points. His best finish was three seventh place finishes in the final three races.

Racing record

Career summary

Complete Auto GP World Series results
(key) (Races in bold indicate pole position) (Races in italics indicate fastest lap)

Complete GP2 Series results
(key) (Races in bold indicate pole position) (Races in italics indicate fastest lap)

Indy Lights

References

External links
 

1981 births
Living people
Sportspeople from Caracas
Venezuelan people of Italian descent
Venezuelan racing drivers
Italian Formula Renault 2.0 drivers
Formula Renault Eurocup drivers
GP2 Series drivers
Indy Lights drivers
Latin America Formula Renault 2000 drivers
Auto GP drivers
Belardi Auto Racing drivers
Team Lazarus drivers
Ombra Racing drivers
LATAM Challenge Series drivers
Cram Competition drivers